Martin Garner (July 9, 1927 – September 28, 2001) was an American film and television actor. He is known for playing the role of "Mr. Weinstein" in the 1983 film Twilight Zone: The Movie.

Born in Brooklyn, New York. Garner appeared in television programs including Barney Miller, Taxi, The John Larroquette Show, Mr. Belvedere, Cagney & Lacey, St. Elsewhere, Welcome Back, Kotter, The A-Team, The Bob Newhart Show and Kojak. He also appeared in films such as My Favorite Year, Airplane II: The Sequel, Oh, God! You Devil, The Frisco Kid and The Big Fix.

Garner died in September 2001 at the Actors Fund Home in Englewood, New Jersey. He was buried at Calverton National Cemetery in Long Island, New York.

Filmography

Film

Television

References

External links 

Rotten Tomatoes profile

1927 births
2001 deaths
People from Brooklyn
American male television actors
American male film actors
20th-century American male actors
Burials at Calverton National Cemetery